is a senior high school in Esashi, Hiyama Subprefecture, Hokkaido, Japan.

Bus lines connect the school to Hakodate Station and Yakumo Station. It was previously accessible from the Esashi Station.

References

External links
 Hokkaido Esashi High School 

High schools in Hokkaido
Education in Hokkaido
Esashi, Hokkaido (Hiyama)